Albert Koochooei is an Iranian writer, journalist, translator and radio broadcaster.

Early life and education 
Koochooei was born in Hamadan. When he was seven years old, he moved to Abadan with his family, where he graduated from high school.

To continue his education, he moved to Tehran and received his master's degree in Journalism. He has also studied at both the Pars College and Junior College of Translation.

Career 
He began his career on the radio and press when he was a teenager, and became a presenter on the Oil Company Radio Channel.

He moved to Urmia, where he worked as a producer, writer, Persian-speaking broadcaster and also Assyrian radio supervisor.

Following his move to Tehran for his studies, he worked as a producer and radio host in Islamic Republic of Iran Broadcasting (IRIB).

In 2000, he was the editor of Mosahebeh magazine; in 2002, he was a writer and speaking broadcaster of cultural programs before and after the 1979 Iranian Revolution. In 2004, he was the editor of the journals Tirajeh, Nasime Doosti, Didar and Astaneh.  He was an art critic in the newspapers and magazines Ayandegan, Bamshad,  and Khoosheh in the 50s (Iranian calendar)

He was a radio presenter at IRIB Radio Payam.

He is currently a columnist for the Etemad daily newspaper.

Books 

 Manuscripts,  Albert Koochooei, published by Pooyandeh Publication, 2009
 The Epic of Ghatina, William Danial, translated by Albert Koochooei, Pooyande Publication, 2009
 Like Walking On a Razor, Albert Koochooei, published by Negah Publications, 2013. This book is about journalism, the Iranian press and media before and after the revolution. The writings are based on a detailed discussion between Koochooei and Mohammad Bagher Rezaee.
Unfinished Concert, Federico García Lorca, translated by Albert Koochooei, published by Pooyandeh Publication, 2014.
 More than three thousand articles and reviews in cultural journals of the country
 Translation of the book of Assyrian Tragedy
 Translation of Pablo Neruda's poetry collection
 Translations of the full collection of Ghatina and Kerma Al Ghooshi

Awards and recognition 
Koochooei received an honorary PhD degree in performing arts for his influential presence in performing arts and art criticism.
He also won the IRIB International Festival Statue.

In 2016, Koochooei was honored in the National Museum of Iran for his outstanding presence during the preceding 55 years.

He has been active in the Assyrian community and was selected twice as the chair of the Assyrian Association of Tehran. He was also selected three times as the head of parent-teacher association of the Holy Maryam Educational complex.

References

External links 

Iranian journalists
Iranian radio people
Living people
Iranian Assyrian people
Assyrian Iranian writers
Year of birth missing (living people)
People from Hamadan
20th-century Iranian people
21st-century Iranian people
Iranian radio and television presenters